Jorge Salcedo is the name of:

 Jorge Salcedo (actor) (1915–1988), Argentinian actor
 Jorge Salcedo (soccer) (born 1972), American soccer player and coach
 Jorge Salcedo Cabrera (born 1947), Colombian informant for the DEA